Shahrak-e Javad ol Aymeh (also Romanized as Shahrak-e Javād ol Āymeh) is a village in Qarah Bagh Rural District, in the Central District of Shiraz County, Fars Province, Iran. At the 2006 census, its population was 148, in 34 families.

References 

Populated places in Shiraz County